Over Staveley is a civil parish in the South Lakeland District of Cumbria, England.  It contains six listed buildings that are recorded in the National Heritage List for England.  Of these, one is listed at Grade II*, the middle of the three grades, and the others are at Grade II, the lowest grade.  The parish contains the village of Staveley and the surrounding countryside.  The listed buildings consist of the tower of a former church, a bridge, a house, a public house, a mill, and a church.


Key

Buildings

References

Citations

Sources

Lists of listed buildings in Cumbria